Motteggiana (Lower Mantovano:  or ) is a comune (municipality) in the Province of Mantua in the Italian region Lombardy, located about  southeast of Milan and about  south of Mantua.

The municipality of Motteggiana contains the frazioni (subdivisions, mainly villages and hamlets) Torricella and Villa Saviola.

Motteggiana borders the following municipalities: Borgo Virgilio, Pegognaga, San Benedetto Po, Suzzara, Viadana.

Demographic evolution

Twin towns
Motteggiana is twinned with:

  Tur'an, Israel, since 2012

References

External links
 www.comune.motteggiana.mn.it/
 http://lombardia.indettaglio.it/eng/comuni/mn/motteggiana/motteggiana.html

Cities and towns in Lombardy